The 2019 Africa Cup of Nations (abbreviated as AFCON 2019 or CAN 2019), known as the Total 2019 Africa Cup of Nations for sponsorship reasons, was the 32nd edition of the Africa Cup of Nations, the biennial international men's football championship of Africa organized by the Confederation of African Football (CAF). The tournament was hosted by Egypt. The competition was held from 21 June to 19 July 2019, as per the decision of the CAF Executive Committee on 20 July 2017 to move the Africa Cup of Nations from January/February to June/July for the first time. It was also the first Africa Cup of Nations expanded from 16 to 24 teams.

The tournament was initially scheduled to be hosted by Cameroon. Cameroon would have hosted the competition for the first time since 1972. They were also the title holders after winning the previous edition. On 30 November 2018, Cameroon was stripped of hosting the 2019 Africa Cup of Nations due to delays in the delivery of infrastructure, the Boko Haram insurgency and the Anglophone Crisis. However, the country was given the right to host the next edition of the tournament. On 8 January 2019, Egypt was chosen by the CAF Executive Committee as the host nation of the competition. The tournament was also moved from the original dates of 15 June – 13 July to 21 June – 19 July due to Ramadan.

Cameroon were the defending champions, but were eliminated in the round of 16 by Nigeria. Hosts Egypt were eliminated at the same stage after losing 0–1 to South Africa. Algeria defeated Senegal 1–0 in the final, winning their second title and first since 1990, while Nigeria came third after beating Tunisia 1–0 in the third-place play-off match.

Host selection 
After the CAF Executive Committee meeting on 24 January 2014, it was announced that there were six official candidates for the 2019 edition:

Bids:
Algeria
Cameroon
Ivory Coast

Rejected Bids:
Guinea / Guinea-Bissau / Liberia / Sierra Leone
Kenya  / Uganda
Malawi / Zambia / Zimbabwe
Nigeria
Senegal

This list was different from the list of the host nation bids for both the 2019 and 2021 edition of the Cup of Nations as announced by CAF in November 2013, with Gabon also on the original list, but Cameroon not on it. Among the six official candidates, Algeria, Guinea and Ivory Coast also bid for hosting the 2021 Africa Cup of Nations.

Democratic Republic of the Congo had originally put themselves forward as host candidates but withdrew in July 2014. Security concerns and threats from various militant groups particularly in the eastern part of the country were an early issue with a Congolese bid. Before bidding solo Guinea was part of a four-way joint bid with Guinea-Bissau, Sierra Leone and Liberia, similarly Zambia was originally part of a joint bid with Malawi and Zimbabwe. Other nations who expressed early interest in hosting were 2013 champions Nigeria, Senegal, and a joint bid of Kenya and Uganda.

The decision of the host country was postponed from early 2014 to grant each bidding country adequate time to receive the inspection delegation. After the final vote at the CAF Executive Committee meeting, on 20 September 2014, the CAF announced the hosts for the 2019, 2021 and 2023 AFCON tournaments: 2019 to Cameroon, 2021 to Ivory Coast, and 2023 to Guinea.

New bid process
It was expected that Cameroon would host this edition but it was sidelined by the CAF on 30 November 2018 in Accra, Ghana for non-compliance with the specifications, CAF announced that they would be receiving applications for the new hosts until 14 December 2018.

Bids:
Egypt
South Africa

The organization of the competition was finally awarded to Egypt on 8 January 2019 by the CAF Executive Committee meeting in Dakar, Senegal. Voters had a choice between two countries after Morocco's sports minister confirmed that his country was not interested in hosting: Egypt and South Africa.

North Africa will host the tournament for the first time in 13 years after being hosted by Egypt also in 2006.

This is the fifth time that Egypt will host the African Cup after 1959, 1974, 1986 and the 2006 to become the country that has hosted it for the most times in the continent.

Prize money 
The CAF increased in 2019, the prize money to be shared among the teams participating in the Africa Cup of Nations.

Sponsorship 
In July 2016, Total secured an eight-year sponsorship package from the Confederation of African Football (CAF) to support 10 of its principal competitions. Total started with the Africa Cup of Nations that was held in Gabon in 2017 therefore renaming it to Total Africa Cup of Nations.

Mascot

The organizing board of the 2019 African Cup of Nations revealed the AFCON 2019 Mascot; "Tut", which was inspired by the Egyptian Pharaoh Tutankhamun. His kit bears resemblance to Egypt's home colors, with the map of Africa visible on his shirt as well as the tournament's logo.

Match ball
CAF replaced Mittre with Umbro as The official match ball, named Neo Pro, was unveiled on 29 May 2019.

Qualification

Due to Morocco withdrawing from being hosts of the 2015 edition, CAF banned the national team of Morocco from entering the 2017 and 2019 Africa Cups of Nations. However, the ban was overturned by the Court of Arbitration for Sport, meaning Morocco, having qualified for this edition of the African Cup of Nations, could participate in the tournament.

Due to the withdrawal of Chad during 2017 Africa Cup of Nations qualification, they were banned from entering the 2019 Africa Cup of Nations.

Qualified teams
The following teams qualified for the tournament:

Venues
With the Africa Cup of Nations expanded from 16 to 24 teams, at least six venues were expected to be used. After the 2017 Africa Cup of Nations, the CAF agreed to increase the number of teams from 16 to 24, following the UEFA Euro 2016. 

After being awarded the bid, initially Egypt chose eight stadiums to host the tournament. The eight stadiums were Cairo International Stadium and Al Salam Stadium in Cairo, Alexandria Stadium and Haras El Hodoud Stadium in Alexandria, Egyptian Army Stadium and Suez Stadium in Suez, Ismailia Stadium in Ismailia and Al Masry Club Stadium in Port Said. Later, Al Salam Stadium was replaced with 30 June Stadium, which was another stadium located in Cairo. It was expected that the famous Borg El Arab Stadium in Alexandria and Osman Ahmed Osman Stadium in Cairo would be used in the tournament, but they weren't selected.

On 17 February 2019, it was confirmed that only six stadiums would be used. The six venues were Cairo International Stadium and 30 June Stadium in Cairo, Alexandria Stadium in Alexandria, Suez Stadium in Suez, Ismailia Stadium in Ismailia and Al Masry Club Stadium in Port Said.

However, on 13 March 2019, Al Masry Club Stadium in Port Said was replaced by Al Salam Stadium in Cairo after discovering a problem with one of the stadium's main stands.

Match officials
The following referees were chosen for the 2019 Africa Cup of Nations.

Referees

  Mustapha Ghorbal
  Hélder Martins Rodrigues de Carvalho
  Joshua Bondo
  Pacifique Ndabihawenimana
  Sidi Alioum
  Gehad Grisha
  Amin Omar
  Ibrahim Nour El Din
  Bamlak Tessema Weyesa
  Eric Otogo-Castane
  Bakary Gassama
  Peter Waweru
  Andofetra Rakotojaona
  Mahamadou Keita
  Beida Dahane
  Ahmad Imetehaz Heeralall
  Noureddine El Jaafari
  Rédouane Jiyed
  Jean Jacques Ndala Ngambo
  Louis Hakizimana
  Maguette Ndiaye
  Issa Sy
  Bernard Camille
  Victor Gomes
  Sadok Selmi
  Youssef Essrayri
  Haythem Guirat
  Janny Sikazwe

Assistant referees

  Mokrane Gourari
  Abdelhak Etchiali
  Jerson Emiliano Dos Santos
  Seydou Tiama
  Nguegoue Elvis Guy Noupue
  Evarist Menkouande
  Issa Yaya
  Soulaimane Almadine
  Tahssen Abo El Sadat
  Abouelregal Mahmoud
  Ahmed Hossam Taha
  Timothy Kiprono Kirui
  Tesfagiorghis Berhe
  Samuel Temesgin
  Sidibe Sidiki
  Gilbert Cheruiyot
  Souru Phatsoane
  Attia Amsaaed
  Lionel Andrianantenaina
  Azgaou Lahcen
  Mustapha Akarkad
  Arsenio Maringule
  Mahamadou Yahaya
  Baba Adel
  Oliver Safari
  El Hadji Malick Samba
  Zakhele Thusi Siwela
  Mohammed Ibrahim
  Waleed Ahmed Ali
  Yamen Mellouchi
  Anouar Hmila
  Mark Ssonko

Video assistant referees
The EFA announced the video assistant referees (VARs) would be introduced during the 2019 Africa Cup of Nations, starting from the quarter-finals.

   Benoît Millot
   Pol van Boekel

Squads

Each team had to register a squad of 23 players (Regulations Article 72).

Format
Only the hosts received an automatic qualification spot, with the other 23 teams qualifying through a qualification tournament. At the finals, the 24 teams were drawn into six groups of four teams each. The teams in each group played a single round robin. After the group stage, the top two teams and the four best third-placed teams advanced to the round of 16. The winners advanced to the quarter-finals. The winners of the quarter-finals advanced to the semi-finals. The losers of the semi-finals played in a third place play-off, while winners of the semi-finals played in the final.

Draw
The draw took place on 12 April 2019, 20:00 CAT (UTC+2), facing the Sphinx and the Pyramids in Giza, Egypt. The 24 teams were drawn into six groups of four teams.

The draw procedure was approved by the CAF Executive Committee on 11 April 2019. For the draw, the teams were allocated to four pots based on the FIFA World Rankings of April 2019 (shown in brackets). Hosts Egypt were automatically assigned to position A1. Defending champions Cameroon were also automatically placed into Pot 1.

Group stage
The top two teams of each group, along with the best four third-placed teams, advanced to the round of 16.

All times are local, CAT (UTC+2).

Tiebreakers
Teams were ranked according to points (3 points for a win, 1 point for a draw, 0 points for a loss), and if tied on points, the following tiebreaking criteria were applied, in the order given, to determine the rankings (Regulations Article 74):
Points in head-to-head matches among tied teams;
Goal difference in head-to-head matches among tied teams;
Goals scored in head-to-head matches among tied teams;
If more than two teams were tied, and after applying all head-to-head criteria above, a subset of teams were still tied, all head-to-head criteria above were reapplied exclusively to this subset of teams;
Goal difference in all group matches; 
Goals scored in all group matches;
Drawing of lots.

Group A

Group B

Group C

Group D

Group E

Group F

Ranking of third-placed teams

Knockout stage

In the knockout stage, extra time and a penalty shoot-out were used to decide the winner if necessary, except for the third place match, where a direct penalty shoot-out, without any extra time, was used to decide the winner if necessary (Regulations Article 75).

Bracket

Round of 16

Quarter-finals

Semi-finals

Third place play-off

Final

Statistics

Goalscorers

Awards
The following awards were given at the conclusion of the tournament:

CAF AFCON Team of the Tournament

References

External links

 
2019
International association football competitions hosted by Egypt
Nations
June 2019 sports events in Africa
July 2019 sports events in Africa
2018–19 in Egyptian football